Dawit Kebede (Ge'ez: ዳዊት ከበደ) born 11 September 1980, is an Ethiopian journalist and winner of the 2010 CPJ International Press Freedom Award.

Professional career
Dawit received his BA  in journalism and communication from Unity University, and later studied master's degree in the United States at Arizona State University's Walter Cronkite School of Journalism and Mass Communication.

Dawit started his professional career as a columnist in Ethiopian newspapers on socio-political issues in 2001. He later worked at Habesha Journal magazine, a bilingual health journal. In 2004 Dawit founded and became editor-in-chief of Hadar Newspaper, which has been critical of the policies of Prime Minister Zenawi's government.

2005 election controversy
During the 2005 Ethiopian general election, police opened gunfire in June 2005  against opposition supporters in Addis Ababa. Dawit critically condemned this action, referring to article 15 of the nation's constitution. Article 15 of the Ethiopian constitution states that "Every person has the right to life. No person may be deprived of his life except as a punishment for a serious criminal offence determined by law."

In November 2005 authorities arrested him along with senior leaders of the then leading opposition group, Coalition for Unity and Democracy for alleged involvement in the demonstrations. All were charged with treason, genocide, and attempts to subvert the constitution. The court later sentenced the prisoners to life in prison but they were pardoned and freed in July 2007. Though many of the editors in jail with Dawit have gone into exile, Dawit decided to remain in Ethiopia.

Establishment of Awramba Times
Dawit established a new company in March 2008 and began publishing the Awramba Times newspaper, of which he is Managing Editor. Until its closure in November 2011, the newspaper managed to become the second largest Ethiopian newspaper and the country's only newspaper that questions state authorities according to the Committee to Protect Journalists (CPJ).

In June 2011, CNN made Dawit Kebede a subject of its AfricanVoices program, which according to CNN "highlights Africa's most engaging personalities, exploring the lives and passions of people who rarely open themselves up to the camera".

In this half-hour-long interview, Dawit said that the Ethiopian press existed in a climate of fear, claiming that after the 2005 election it wasn't easy for journalists in Ethiopia to do their work independently.

Life in exile 
In November 2011, Dawit fled to the United States, fearing a lift of the government pardon that spared him from a life sentence. Following his decision to join the list of Ethiopian exiled journalists, rights groups say Dawit's fate is increasingly becoming a classical fate of contemporary Ethiopian journalists working in the independent press. CPJ said "Dawit Kebede has endured all of the Ethiopian government's tactics to silence independent voices, from official intimidation and state-sponsored smear campaigns to the jailing of his staff. The silencing of Awramba Times leaves the country with only one remaining independent critical newspaper.

Dawit Kebede corroborated his claim citing a piece published on the state-owned Amharic daily, Addis Zemen, which accused him of links with terrorist groups and called on the government "to revoke his pardon". Government officials, however, denied any plan to prosecute and insisted that the piece on Addis Zemen was merely an opinion piece.

Relaunching of Awramba Times From exile 
In May 2012, Dawit reestablished Awramba Times in an online form from Washington, D.C., which became popular fast getting the endorsement of Ethiopians all over the world.

However, some diaspora-based extreme right-wing elites and opposition sites entered into a protracted tit-for-tat with Dawit as he has always been balanced in his reports.

In July 2013, one opposition site claimed Dawit had been to the Ethiopian Embassy in Washington and had a secret meeting with Ethiopia's foreign minister, Dr. Tedros Adhanom, which is considered a taboo by the diaspora opposition. At the time, in response to an email inquiry by horn affairs, Dawit denied the claim by producing a copy of his flight booking which appears to show he left Washington to Arizona two days prior to the date of the alleged meeting.

Dawit retaliated by publishing pieces critical to key diaspora opposition players, including leaked recordings in which Berhanu Nega (PhD) discusses the $500,000 fund he received from Eritrea to finance Ginbot 7's "military activities", the online TV ESAT and "domestic peaceful struggles and diplomatic activities".

Return to Ethiopia 
After two years stay in the US, Dawit announced his decision to handover his asylum papers and return home, in October 2014.

Dawit claimed that he had reasonable grounds to flee but, in hindsight, they were not insurmountable and he should have stayed at home. Adding that, his passion for journalism and the inability to advance the profession from afar are the decisive factors in his decision to return to Ethiopia.

Dawit conceded the quarrel with the diaspora opposition was an input into his overall assessment, though it was not the direct cause of his decision to return.

Dawit continued to manage the Awramba Times after his return to Ethiopia. , he was popular on Twitter, with 75,000 followers, and posted on topics such as ethnic profiling of people identifiable as having Tigrayan ethnicity.

On 30 November 2020, during the Tigray War, Dawit was detained in Addis Ababa for publishing "false information" and damaging the government's image. He appeared in court on 2 December and 15 December. The court gave police 10 additional days to hold Dawit in custody.

Awards 
In November 2010, Dawit Kebede received CPJ's International Press Freedom Award. CPJ announced that Dawit was selected to receive the prize for risking his freedom and security in the course of his reporting.

References

Living people
Ethiopian journalists
1980 births